The Hyderabad Massacres of 1948 refers to the mass killings of that took place in the aftermath of the Indian annexation of Hyderabad (Operation Polo). The killings, perpetrated by local Hindu militias assisted by the Indian Army, and at times, the Indian army itself, resulted in the deaths of more than 200,000 civilians between September–October 1948. According to the Sunderlal Committee report,  report produced by the government of India, the civilian death toll was between 27,000 to 40,000. Apart from mass killings, activists such as Sundarayya mention systematic torture, rapes, and lootings by Indian soldiers.

Background

Violence 
Violence occurred in many rural areas, however the worst areas afflicted were Osmanabad, Nanded, Gulbarga, and Bidar where “the sufferers were Muslims  who formed the hopeless minority.”
Crimes against Muslims that occurred included but was not limited to the desecration of mosques, mass killings, seizures of houses and land, looting and arson of Muslim shops, as well as rape and abduction of women.

The Pandit Sunderlal Committee that was commissioned by Jawaharlal Nehru, in his "personal capacity", and contained Pandit Sunderlal, Kazi Abdul Ghaffar, Maulana Abdulla Misri, and Farrouk Sayer Shakeri in order to “study existing conditions and help in the establishment of communal harmony.”
Its Report contained a detailed description of the violence that took on during and after Operation Polo. The report, although made in 1948, was kept hidden from public eyes, until it was made available for viewing at the Nehru Memorial Museum and Library. It is unconfirmed why the report was hidden, but some say it was to prevent further instances of communal violence from happening. Vallabhbhai Patel refused to accept this report, and when sent a copy, had said, “There could have been no question of Government of India of sending any goodwill mission to India...There is nothing in it about the Razakar atrocities...” However, this is false, because in the Confidential Notes of the Sunderlal Report, the authors issued an entire section of Razakar atrocities. 
“During our tours we also heard statements of Razakar atrocities...Their atrocities chiefly consisted in levying monthly amounts on very town and village. Where ever these amounts were willingly paid there was general no further trouble. But at places they were resisted, loot followed. If there was no trouble during the loot trouble generally ended, in the removal of looted property, sometimes in motor trucks. But wherever there was further resistance, arson, murder, even rape and abduction of women followed.”
The report also conservatively put the death toll to between 27,000 and 40,000 civilian lives lost. Violence against Muslims is told largely through the report, eyewitness accounts and other sources.
“In Osmanabad....the town of Latur in the same district fared even worse. Some witnesses told us that number of Muslims murdered in Latur was somewhere between 2000 and 2500...Latur was a big business centre. It had big Kutchi merchants. The total Muslim population was nearly ten thousand. When we visited the town, it was barely three thousand. Evidently many ran away to save their lives, The killing lasted twenty days...Our idea is that the total killed in Gulburage district must have been between 5000 and 8000...The district of Bidar fared at least as ill if not worse than Gulburga. The fourth district is Nanded. With the total killed according to our estimate somewhere between 2000 and 4000. When we talk of killed, we do not include those who died fighting but only those murdered in cold blood.”

”It appears the as the Muslim population fled in panic towards the headquarters of the state or other villages which they thought might be safer, a very large number was killed on the way and in the jungles. In many places we were shown well or Bawaries still full of corpses rotting. In one such, we counted 11 bodies which included that of a woman with a small child sticking to her breast...We saw several such wells. We saw remnants of corpses lying in ditches. At several places the bodies had been burnt and we could see the charred bones and skulls still lying there.”

Another important feature of the violence was the role of the Indian Army and administration in the violence of the massacres.
“...we had absolutely unimpeachable evidence to the effect that there were instances in which men belonging to the Indian Army and also to the local police took part in the looting and local crimes...soldiers encouraged persuaded and in a few cases even compelled the Hindu mobs to loot Muslim homes and shops. In another district, a Munsif house, among others, was looted by soldiers and a Tehsildar's wife molested. Complaints of molestion and abduction of girls, against Sikh soldiers was by no means rare.”

”We are also informed that a large mix of trained and armed men from a well-known Hindu communal organization filtered into the state along with the Indian Army from Sholapur...The Indian Army wherever it went, ordered the people to surrender all arms. The order applied to Hindus and Muslims alike. But in practice, while all arms were taken from the Muslims, sometimes with the Hindu population, the Hindus from whom the Indian military had little to fear were left in possession of their arms.”
It is important to note however a majority of the Hindu aggressors against Muslims had suffered under the hands of the Razakars and the Nizam administration. Many felt with the advent of the Indian Army, that they were the Hindus’ savior and felt emboldened to take revenge against the Muslims. Despite such tragedy, there were reports of communal harmony throughout these events.
“It is to be noted that that the Union armies rescued the very Deshmukhs and Razakar leader, Kasim Razvi, who were responsible for setting fire to village after village and the killing is of hundreds of people. At the same time, the ordinary Muslims, who stood against the atrocities of the Nizam, were pounced upon and untold miseries were inflicted upon them. The Hindu people in those villages rescued such innocent Muslim people to the extent possible, gave shelter to them in their houses and rescued thousands of Muslim families from the campaigns of rape and murder indulged by the Union army.”

See also 
Persecution of Muslims
Violence against Muslims in India

References 

1948 murders in India
Wars involving Hyderabad
Conflicts in India
Anti-Muslim violence in India
Violence against Muslims